Gerardo Cortes Rencoret Sr. (born 27 June 1928; date of death unknown) was a Chilean modern pentathlete. He competed at the 1956 Summer Olympics. His son, Gerardo Cortes Jr., competed in the pentathlon at the 1988 Summer Olympics.

References

1928 births
Year of death unknown
Chilean male modern pentathletes
Olympic modern pentathletes of Chile
Modern pentathletes at the 1956 Summer Olympics
Pan American Games bronze medalists for Chile
Pan American Games medalists in modern pentathlon
Modern pentathletes at the 1955 Pan American Games
Medalists at the 1955 Pan American Games
20th-century Chilean people